Samuel McKean (April 7, 1787December 14, 1841) was an American merchant and politician from Burlington, Pennsylvania, who served as a Democratic member of the U.S. Senate for Pennsylvania from 1833 to 1839 and of the U.S. House of Representatives for Pennsylvania's 9th congressional district from 1823 to 1829.  He served in the Pennsylvania House of Representatives from 1815 to 1819 and the Pennsylvania State Senate for the 11th district from 1829 to 1830.

Biography
Samuel McKean was born on April 7, 1787, in Huntingdon County, Pennsylvania. He worked as a merchant in Burlington, Pennsylvania, before becoming a member of the Bradford County board of commissioners. McKean served in the Pennsylvania House of Representatives from 1815 until 1819 and was a major general in the Pennsylvania State Militia. He was elected to the United States House of Representatives in 1822 and was re-elected in 1824 and 1826, serving until March 1829. While in the U.S. House, he was a member of the Committee on Post Offices and Post Roads during the 20th Congress. He then returned to the state legislature, serving in the Pennsylvania Senate for the 11th district from 1829 to 1830.

A Democrat, McKean served as a presidential elector for the Jackson/Van Buren ticket during the 1832 election. He was elected by the state legislature to the United States Senate in 1833, where he served one term until March 1839. He was chairman of the Senate Committee to Audit and Control the Contingent Expenses from 1835 until 1839.

McKean died in West Burlington, Pennsylvania, on December 14, 1841, and was interred in the Old Methodist Church Cemetery in Burlington, Pennsylvania.

His nephew James B. McKean was a U.S. Representative from New York from 1859 until 1863.

References

External links

|-

|-

1787 births
1841 deaths
People from Huntingdon County, Pennsylvania
American people of Scotch-Irish descent
Democratic-Republican Party members of the United States House of Representatives from Pennsylvania
Jacksonian members of the United States House of Representatives from Pennsylvania
Jacksonian United States senators from Pennsylvania
Democratic Party United States senators from Pennsylvania
Democratic Party members of the Pennsylvania House of Representatives
Burials in Pennsylvania